Guy Walker (born 12 September 1995) is an Australian cricketer. He was born in Nottinghamshire whilst his father, Lyndsay Walker, was playing county cricket for Nottinghamshire County Cricket Club.

He made his Twenty20 (T20) debut for Melbourne Renegades in the 2015–16 Big Bash League season on 19 December 2015. In late 2018, Walker signed as an Australian rules football rookie with Melbourne, but retired due to a shoulder nerve injury one year later without having played an AFL game.

References

External links
 

1995 births
Living people
Australian cricketers
Melbourne Renegades cricketers
Cricketers from Nottingham